Kääriku is a village in Otepää Parish, Valga County in southeastern Estonia. It has a population of 53 (as of 7 February 2008), and of 48 as of 5 January 2013.

References

Villages in Valga County
Tourist attractions in Valga County